Satara Melonie Murray (born 1 July 1993) is a Jamaican professional footballer who plays as a defender for Racing Louisville of the American National Women's Soccer League (NWSL). She has previously played for English clubs Liverpool and Bristol City, Houston Dash of the NWSL, and Kolbotn Fotball of the Norwegian Toppserien.

Born in New York and raised in Texas, Murray won a collegiate national championship with North Carolina Tar Heels before starting her professional career in 2015 with Liverpool of the FA Women's Super League. She spent four years with Liverpool before joining Houston Dash on a free transfer.

Collegiate career 
Murray had a stellar collegiate career, appearing 85 times for the North Carolina Tar Heels.  She was instrumental in helping UNC win its 21st national championship in 2012. For her effort, she was twice named an All-American as well as the most outstanding defensive player at the 2012 NCAA College Cup.

Professional career

Liverpool 
Murray signed with two-time defending FA WSL champion Liverpool in 2015.  While at the club she made 68 appearances at centre-back and right-back, scoring two goals.

Houston Dash 
Murray was recruited through the NWSL Discovery Process by the Houston Dash  ahead of their 2019 season.  A native from Austin she expressed excitement at playing in her home state.

International career 
Born in the United States, Murray was also eligible to represent England through her mother (who was born in London), Jamaica through her paternal family, Antigua and Barbuda through her maternal grandfather or Guyana through her maternal grandmother.

In 2010, Guyana named Murray to its provisional squad for the Gold Cup. Despite Guyana head coach Mark Rodrigues' excitement over her inclusion at the time, Murray ultimately did not play for Guyana.

Following her move to Liverpool and after not receiving international call-ups by the United States, Murray was called up to the England U23 team for two training camps in 2016.

On 24 October 2021, Murray made her senior international debut for Jamaica.

References

External links

 
 Liverpool LFC player profile 
 
 

1993 births
Living people
Citizens of Jamaica through descent
Jamaican people of English descent
Jamaican people of Antigua and Barbuda descent
Sportspeople of Antigua and Barbuda descent
Jamaican people of Guyanese descent
Sportspeople of Guyanese descent
Jamaican women's footballers
Women's association football defenders
Kolbotn Fotball players
Toppserien players
Jamaica women's international footballers
Jamaican expatriate women's footballers
Jamaican expatriate sportspeople in Norway
Expatriate women's footballers in Norway
Sportspeople from Brooklyn
Soccer players from New York City
Soccer players from Austin, Texas
American women's soccer players
North Carolina Tar Heels women's soccer players
Pali Blues players
Houston Dash players
USL W-League (1995–2015) players
National Women's Soccer League players
American expatriate women's soccer players
American expatriate sportspeople in Norway
African-American women's soccer players
21st-century African-American women
American sportspeople of Jamaican descent
American people of English descent
American people of Antigua and Barbuda descent
American sportspeople of Guyanese descent
Citizens of the United Kingdom through descent
English women's footballers
Liverpool F.C. Women players
Bristol City W.F.C. players
Women's Super League players
Women's Championship (England) players
English expatriate women's footballers
English expatriate sportspeople in Norway
Black British sportswomen